Joseph J. Bouchard (born November 9, 1948) is an American musician. He was the bassist and one of the lead singers of the hard rock band Blue Öyster Cult during their most successful period. He is the younger brother of original Blue Öyster Cult drummer Albert Bouchard.

Bouchard was born in Watertown, New York.

Discography 
With Blue Öyster Cult
 Blue Öyster Cult
 Tyranny and Mutation
 Secret Treaties
 On Your Feet or on Your Knees
 Agents of Fortune
 Spectres
 Some Enchanted Evening
 Mirrors
 Cultösaurus Erectus
 The Heavy Metal Movie Soundtrack
 Fire of Unknown Origin
 Extraterrestrial Live
 The Revölution by Night
 Club Ninja
 Imaginos (credited for keyboards and vocals)
 Live 1976
 Workshop of the Telescopes
 Don't Fear the Reaper: The Best of Blue Öyster Cult
 The Columbia Albums Collection

Solo albums
 Jukebox in My Head
 Tales from the Island
 New Solid Black
 The Power of Music
 Playin' History
 Strange Legends
 American Rocker

With The X Brothers
 Dedicated Follower of Fashion
 Beyond the Valley of the X
 Solid Citizens

References

External links 
Joe Bouchard's web page
Interview with Joe Bouchard
Blue Coupe web site

1948 births
American rock bass guitarists
American heavy metal bass guitarists
American male bass guitarists
Blue Öyster Cult members
Living people
People from Watertown, New York
People from Clayton, New York
American male guitarists
Ithaca College alumni
20th-century American guitarists